Francisco José Pereira Pinto Balsemão (born 1 September 1937) is a Portuguese businessman, former journalist and retired politician, who served as Prime Minister of Portugal, from 1981 to 1983.

Background
He is the son of Henrique Patrício de Balsemão (Guarda, Guarda, 9 September 1897 – ?) and wife (married Lisbon, 21 May 1922) Maria Adelaide van Zeller de Castro Pereira (Sintra, 11 August 1897 – 02 March 1984).

Career
Being a licentiate in Law from the University of Lisbon, Pinto Balsemão's pre-political career was in newspaper publishing. After working as a journalist and then as an administrator of Diário Popular (the People's Daily in English) from 1963 to 1971, he founded the Expresso magazine in 1973 and continued to direct it until 1980. He is one of top managers and owners of Impresa media group.

Pinto Balsemão was Member of parliament before the revolution (1969–1973), when, together with Francisco de Sá Carneiro, Joaquim Magalhães Mota, Carlos Mota Pinto, João Bosco Mota Amaral, Alberto João Jardim, António Barbosa de Melo and António Marques Mendes, he helped to found the Social Democratic Party (PSD), of which he is currently member number 1. In 1975 he was elected to the Constituent Assembly, which was charged with drafting a new constitution and served as an interim legislature. Pinto Balsemão was chosen as a Vice-President of this body.

Following the victory of the Democratic Alliance (a coalition led by the PSD) in two parliamentary elections (in 1979 and 1980), Pinto Balsemão held senior positions in two cabinets led by Prime Minister Sá Carneiro.

When Sá Carneiro was killed in an air accident on 4 December 1980, the Social Democratic Party chose Pinto Balsemão to succeed him.  Despite his reputation for competence, he was widely perceived as lacking Sá Carneiro's charisma. He had difficulty maintaining the level of support enjoyed by his party, which had been based to a large extent on Sá Carneiro's personal popularity.  He also had to cope with friction within the Democratic Alliance, and found the Democratic and Social Centre leader, Diogo Freitas do Amaral, a difficult ally. These factors contributed to his defeat in the parliamentary election of 1983.  He finally retired from Parliament in 1987 though not from politics.

Pinto Balsemão currently serves as Chairman of the European Publishers Council and as chief executive officer of Grupo Impresa in Portugal. He was the founder on 6 October 1992 of Sociedade Independente de Comunicação (SIC), the first Portuguese private television network.

He is also a member of Steering Committee of the Bilderberg Group, and as such has attracted some controversy. He participated in more than 30 Bilderberg-Conferences since 1981.

He is also a Member of the Portuguese Council of State, elected by the Assembly of the Republic and chosen by the current President of the Republic his fellow party colleague and former president of the Social Democratic Party (PSD) Aníbal Cavaco Silva.

Family
He married firstly and divorced Maria Isabel de Lacerda Pinto da Costa Lobo, daughter of Manuel da Costa Lobo Cardoso (Vila Real, Vila Real, 15 November 1907 – ?), Director-General of the Banco de Angola, and wife (married Luanda, 20 October 1934) Maria Amélia de Lacerda Rebelo Pinto (Quissol, Malanje – ?), married secondly to José da Franca de Horta Machado Guedes Leitão Cruz (born Lisbon, 18 October 1947), without issue, and had two children: 
 Mónica da Costa Lobo Pinto Balsemão, married to Filipe Pereira Caldas Penaguião (born Luanda, 8 September 1963), son of António Manuel de Paula Morando Penaguião (born Lisbon, 20 June 1935), of Italian descent, and wife Maria João da Costa Pereira Caldas (born Lisbon, 17 June 1945), and had two children (Tomás Pinto Balsemão Penaguião and Marta Pinto Balsemão Penaguião).
 Henrique da Costa Lobo Pinto Balsemão, Director of Programs of SIC, married on 29 April 2006 to Vera Cravinho, and had three children: 
 Maria Cravinho Pinto Balsemão.
 Concha Cravinho Pinto Balsemão.
 Vicente Cravinho Pinto Balsemão (born 2010).

He married secondly Maria Mercedes Aliu Presas, of Spanish descent, and had two children: 
 Joana Presas Pinto Balsemão (born Lisbon, São Sebastião da Pedreira, 25 June 1976), married to Francisco de Atouguia Belford Correia da Silva (born Lisbon, 31 October 1974), son of Pedro de Barros Belford Correia da Silva (born Luanda, 24 April 1946), of the Counts (formerly Viscounts) of Paço de Arcos, of remote English ancestry, and first wife (as her first husband) (married Lisbon, 6 October 1972 and divorced) Margarida Maria de Castro de Atouguia (born Lisbon, Santos-o-Velho, 30 October 1948 –), of the Viscounts of de Atouguia, and had three children (Francisco Pinto Balsemão Correia da Silva (born Oeiras, Paço de Arcos, 29 June 2001), Teresa Pinto Balsemão Correia da Silva (born Lisbon, 9 November 2004) and Pedro Pinto Balsemão Correia da Silva (born Lisbon, 24 August 2007)).   She went to St Julian's School in Carcavelos.  
 Francisco Pedro Presas Pinto Balsemão, unmarried and without issue.

Out of wedlock he had a son by Isabel Maria Supico Pinto (born Lisbon, 26 October 1942), second wife (married São Paulo, São Paulo, 9 June 1976) without issue of Vasco Maria Vasques da Cunha d' Eça da Costa e Almeida, 3rd Viscount of Maiorca (born Lisbon, Encarnação, 12 May 1923), natural daughter of Minister Clotário Luís Supico Ribeiro Pinto (1909–1986, 937th Associate of the Second Tauromachic Club, son of Liberato Damião Ribeiro Pinto and Maria Augusta Supico), by actress Maria Adelaide da Silva Lalande (Castelo Branco, Salgueiro do Campo, 7 November 1913  – Lisbon, 21 March 1968), wife of actor Ribeirinho: 
 Francisco Maria Supico Pinto Balsemão, married Ana Duarte and had two daughters: 
 Isabel Duarte Pinto Balsemão.
 Luísa Duarte Pinto Balsemão.

Honours
 Grand Officer of the Order Merit, Portugal (17 October 1983)
  Grand-Cross of the Order of the Crown, Belgium (23 November 1981)
  Grand-Cross of the National Order of the Southern Cross, Brazil (25 November 1981)
  Grand-Cross of the Order of Merit, Greece (8 September 1982)
 Grand-Cross Order of the Flag of the Republic of Hungary, Hungary (26 November 1982)
  Grand-Cross of the Order of Merit of the Italian Republic, Italy (2 December 1982)
  Grand-Cross of the Order of Pope Pius IX, Holy See (15 March 1983)
  Grand-Cross of the Order of Christ, Portugal (8 June 1983)
  Grand-Cross of the Order of the Yugoslav Flag, Yugoslavia (8 June 1983)
  Grand-Cross of the Order of Isabella the Catholic, Spain (20 March 1989)
  Grand Cross of the Order of Prince Henry, Portugal (5 January 2006)
 Grand Cross of the Order of Liberty, Portugal (25 April 2011)

References

External links

 Francisco Pinto Balsemao in GeneAll.net

1937 births
Living people
Members of the Steering Committee of the Bilderberg Group
People from Lisbon
Prime Ministers of Portugal
Portuguese businesspeople
Portuguese nobility
Social Democratic Party (Portugal) politicians
University of Lisbon alumni
Knights Grand Cross of the Order of Pope Pius IX
Knights Grand Cross of the Order of Isabella the Catholic
Grand Crosses of the Order of the Crown (Belgium)
Knights Grand Cross of the Order of Merit of the Italian Republic
Grand Crosses of the Order of Liberty
Grand Crosses of the Order of Prince Henry
Grand Crosses of the Order of Christ (Portugal)
Portuguese editors
Portuguese people of British descent
Portuguese people of Italian descent
Portuguese people of Swedish descent
Newspaper editors